Jiang Zhuping (born November 1937) is a retired Chinese aerospace engineer and politician. He served as Director of the Civil Aviation Administration of China and Governor and Communist Party Secretary of Hubei Province.

Biography
Jiang Zhuping was born in November 1937 in Yixing, Jiangsu Province. He is the son of Jiang Nanxiang, who served as education minister of China. He joined the work force in 1956 and the Chinese Communist Party in 1960. He graduated in 1963 from the Harbin Military Engineering Institute with a degree in Guided Missile Engineering.

After graduation Jiang worked as an engineer at the No. 5 National Defense Institute, and later became deputy director of the aircraft design institute of the Nanchang Aircraft Factory in Jiangxi and party secretary of a division of the Ministry of Aerospace Industry.

In 1985 he was appointed Executive Vice-Governor of Jiangxi Province, and in 1988 he became concurrently Deputy Party Secretary of Jiangxi. He served in both positions until 1991. From February 1991 to December 1993 he served as Director of the Civil Aviation Administration of China. He then served as Governor of Hubei Province from 1995 to January 2001, and as Communist Party Secretary of Hubei from December 2000 to December 2001.

Jiang was a member of the 14th and the 15th Central Committees of the Chinese Communist Party.

References

1937 births
Living people
Chinese Communist Party politicians from Jiangsu
People's Republic of China politicians from Jiangsu
People from Yixing
Governors of Hubei
Vice-governors of Jiangxi
Directors of the Civil Aviation Administration of China
Harbin Engineering University alumni
Chinese aerospace engineers
Members of the 14th Central Committee of the Chinese Communist Party
Members of the 15th Central Committee of the Chinese Communist Party
Engineers from Jiangsu
Politicians from Wuxi